Burlando is a surname of Italian origin. Notable people with the surname include:

Claudio Burlando (born 1954), Italian politician
Giovanna Burlando (born 1969), Italian synchronized swimmer
Leopoldo Burlando (1841–1915), Italian painter
Luigi Burlando (1899–1967), Italian footballer and manager

Italian-language surnames